Gopichand or Gopi Chand can refer to:

People 
 Gopi Chand Bhargava, Indian politician
 Gopi Chand Narang (born 1931), Indian linguist and writer
 Tripuraneni Gopichand (1910-1962), Telugu novelist, playwright and film director
 Pullela Gopichand (born 1973), Indian badminton player
 Gopichand (actor) (born 1979), Telugu film actor
 Gopichand Lagadapati (born 1981), Indian film actor, writer, director and producer

Others
 The ektara, an Indian string instrument
 Gopichand (film), 1958 Indian film